Muhammad Ayyub Thakur (1948 – 10 March 2004) was a political activist and founder of London-based World Kashmir Freedom Movement (WKFM). He also founded a charity organization called 'Mercy Universal'. In 2011, according to a report by The Telegraph, It was a front group for Pakistan's Inter-Services Intelligence (ISI).  After investigatation by the British Charity Commission, Scotland Yard and the FBI, it was stated that his organization had direct contacts with Hizbul Mujahideen, an EU-Sanctioned insurgent organization.  

In 2001, Indian Government had booked him under  Terrorist and Disruptive Activities (Prevention) Act for providing financing & logistical support to terrorists. 

His son Muzammil Ayub Thakur is an active representative member of the UK based NGO

Early life
Thakur was born in 1948 in a farming family in Pudsoo village near Shopian, district Pulwama in Jammu and Kashmir. He was the eldest of four children.
Thakur obtained his Doctorate (Phd.) in Nuclear Physics from the University of Kashmir.

Career 

In 1978, after a brief stint at the Bhaba Atomic Research Centre (Zakoora, Srinagar), he became  lecturer in the Department of Physics in the University of Kashmir. He had a keen interest in the social and political issues of Jammu and Kashmir.

After becoming lecturer at the University of Kashmir he intensified his subversive political activities. He began organising protests. In August 1980, he and many of his colleagues at university and students organisation, Islami Jamiat-i-Talaba, organised an international conference on the issue of right of self-determination of Kashmiris. the government banned the conference, dismissed Thakur from his job as a university lecturer, and later imprisoned him along with his colleagues under Public Safety Act (PSA).

In 1981, Thakur joined the Nuclear Engineering Department of King Abdulaziz University, Jeddah in Saudi Arabia as a lecturer.

World Kashmir Freedom Movement
WKFM, along with other two organisations founded by Thakur were investigated by Scotland Yard, the Charity Commission and FBI for ties to the Pakistan Military and Militant groups active in Jammu and Kashmir. The FBI implicated the ISI for funding both of these organizations in London and Brussels.

Impounding of Indian Passport and demand for extradition
Upon the revelation of his ties to militant groups, Indian government twice sought his extradition from the UK in 1992 and 1993. After its failure, they finally impounded his passport in 1993. Thakur subsequently obtained British travel papers which he used until his death in 2004.

During the visit of British Home Secretary Jack Straw to India in May 2002, Indian Deputy Prime Minister, LK Advani again demanded extradition of thakur citing  him being accused of providing funds to the terrorists in Jammu and Kashmir. Advani also demanded the arrest of Thakur under the UK's New anti-terrorist laws.

Family Members Allegedly Harassed
Ayub regularly claimed that his family members, relatives and friends were subjected to house raids, torture and harassment by the Indian army [citation needed]. He often claimed that his ancestral home in Kashmir was raided many a time and his parents threatened.

Death
Thakur died at the age of 55, in London on 10 March 2004 after an illness. He was suffering from pulmonary fibrosis. His funeral was held at the London Central Mosque, Regent Park, and he was laid to rest at the Garden of Peace, in Greenford, West London, close to where he had been living for many years. The Indian Government, having stripped him of his citizenship in 1993, dismissed a request by his family that he be buried in Jammu and Kashmir. He is survived by his wife, a son and two daughters.

See also
 Syed Ali Shah Geelani
 Islamic Jihad
 Insurgency in Jammu and Kashmir

Notes and references

External links 
  Mercy Universal - a relief agency working in some of the most deprived areas of the world.
  The Justice Foundation – Kashmir Centre in London
 Kashmiri - Canadian Council
 Kashmir Centre.EU

Kashmiri people
University of Kashmir alumni
Kashmir separatist movement
Jammu and Kashmir politicians
1948 births
2004 deaths
People from Jammu and Kashmir
People from Shopian
Kashmiri Islamists
People charged with terrorism
Fugitives wanted on terrorism charges
Fugitives wanted by India